All Around Frying Pan is a 1925 American silent Western film directed by David Kirkland and starring Fred Thomson, James A. Marcus, and Clara Horton.

Plot
Bart Andrews (Fred Thomson) is a drifting cowboy who is arrested for vagrancy by a sheriff (James A. Marcus) in need of men for the state rad gang.  The sheriff stops off at a rodeo on the way to the jail. At the rodeo, Bart has an opportunity to ride a wild bronc, and he tames the horse.  At the urging of some cowboys, the sheriff allows Bart to go to work on the Lawrence ranch. Bart falls in love with Jean Dawson (Clara Horton), the daughter of ranch manager Jim Dawson (John Lince).

Bart prevents the theft of the trainload of cattle, and later surprises the foreman in the act of robbing the safe at the express office. In the ensuing fight, the station agent is killed, and Bart is accused of the crime. Bart frees himself, brings the foreman to justice, and reveals himself to be the real owner of the Lawrence ranch.

Cast

Production 
All Around Frying Pan was one of several Westerns that Fred Thomson made for FBO, most of which included his white horse, Silver King.

References

External links

 

1925 films
1925 Western (genre) films
American black-and-white films
Films directed by David Kirkland
Film Booking Offices of America films
Silent American Western (genre) films
1920s English-language films
1920s American films